Ganiu Atanda Ogungbe (born 1 December 1992) is a Nigerian professional footballer who plays as a centre back and defensive midfielder.

Club career

Trials in Netherlands 
After U-20 World Cup Ogungbe was invited for a trial in Vitesse, Netherlands. He played a friendly game against AGOVV Apeldoorn and Vitesse was impressed with the player. Also at the time in Vitesse, Chelsea club who has great partnership with Vitesse was interested in the player and could have signed him but for financial reasons the deal did not go through.

Omonia
Ogungbe signed a three-year contract with Cyprus First Division team AC Omonia in summer 2013 after successful trial with the Cypriot team.

Ethnikos Achna
After contract renewal negotiations with AC Omonia did not succeed, Ogungbe signed a contract with Ethnikos Achna. In the 2014–15 season he scored five goals.

Ogungbe signed a new one-year contract with Ethnikos Achna in July 2015. For the second season Ogungbe managed to repeat the five goals of last season.

Enosis Neon
In August 2016, Ogungbe decided to sign with Enosis Neon Paralimni FC, whose manager Kostas Kaiafas was his coach also in AC Omonia.

Busaiteen Club
In August 2017, Ogungbe had signed with Busaiteen Club in Bahrain. The club finished third in the league, Ganiu Atanda Ogungbe played 15 games out of 16 games of the league and scored 5 goals.

After a good season with the Busaiteen Club, the management of the club had decided to sign him for another season, making Ogungbe the only foreign player in the team. Busaiteen Club won the league and Ganiu Atanda was one of the main players of the team scoring another five goals for the team.

Baf Ülkü Yurdu S.K.
After playing in Middle East, Ganiu Atanda Ogungbe was offered a contract in North Cyprus. The team finished the league 6th out of 16.

NK Krško
Atanda started playing 2020/21 season in Slovenia for NK Krško, however the Covid-19 stopped the season early.

Viljandi JK Tulevik
After training off seasons with Viljandi JK Tulevik for couple of years, the management of the team approached yet again Atanda to sign with Viljandi in February 2021 and the two parties agreed on terms. Atanda gave an assist on his first game of the season and was chosen to team of the week.

International career

Youth
At the age of 17, Ogungbe was selected to Nigeria U-20 National team squad in 2010, in 2011 the Flying Eagles won 2011 African Youth Championship in South Africa and they qualified for the 2011 FIFA U-20 World Cup. Ogungbe played four games in 2011 FIFA U-20 World Cupin Colombia, against Guatemala, Croatia, England and France. Nigeria was knocked out of the competition in quarter finals, against France 3–2. when Alexandre Lacazette scored two and Gueïda Fofana added another goal on extra time.

References

External links

Ganiu Ogungbe at Goal
Ganiu Ogungbe at KTFF

1992 births
Living people
Nigerian footballers
Nigeria under-20 international footballers
Association football defenders
AC Omonia players
Ethnikos Achna FC players
Enosis Neon Paralimni FC players
Busaiteen Club players
Cypriot First Division players
Nigerian expatriate footballers
Nigerian expatriate sportspeople in Estonia
Expatriate footballers in Estonia